The Shining South is an accessory for the fictional Forgotten Realms campaign setting for the second edition of the Advanced Dungeons & Dragons fantasy role-playing game.

Contents
The 96-page booklet is wrapped in a removable gatefold cover. The book includes a one-page introduction, explaining that this book covers the region known as the Shining South, and the various countries that comprise it. Pages 3–22 detail the land of Halruaa, a rich, reclusive land famous for its magic and especially its skyships. Pages 23–41 detail the land of Dambrath, a land populated by half-drow. Pages 42–52 detail the land of Luiren, the land of the halflings. Pages 53–72 detail the lands of Durpar, Var, and Estagund, also known as the Shining Lands and a new thief-class kit. Pages 73–80 detail the land of Ulgarth. Pages 82–93 present two Shining South adventure scenarios, Gateway to Elsewhere and Dark as Dark. Pages 94–95 detail two monsters of the Shining South, the dark tree and the laraken.

This book also includes a fold-out color poster map of the region. The inside front cover contains a description of Durparian specialty priests, while the inside back cover contains a list of the thirty-one leading chakas of Durpar. The inside gatefold cover contains a description of Luiren specialty priests, while the outside gatefold cover presents a color map of the city of Vaelen.

Publication history
The book was written by Tom Prusa, and published by TSR. It featured cover art by Jeff Butler.

Reception
John Setzer reviewed the module in White Wolf Magazine No. 41. He rated it a 3 out of a possible 5 for appearance, complexity, and value, and a 4 of 5 for concepts and playability. Overall, he rated it a 3.5 out of 5.

References

Prusa, Tom. The Shining South (TSR, 1993).

Forgotten Realms sourcebooks
Role-playing game supplements introduced in 1993